The hooded grebe (Podiceps gallardoi), is a medium-sized grebe found in the southern region of Argentina. It is found in isolated lakes in the most remote parts of Patagonia and spends winters along the coast of the same region. In 2012 IUCN uplisted the species from Endangered to Critically Endangered.

Ecology

During the breeding season the hooded grebe is found on basaltic lakes in the Patagonian steppes at elevations of 500–1,200 m. Both saline and bitter salt lakes are used by non breeding flocks and some birds which winter on the coast of Argentina. The grebe requires aquatic vegetation in its breeding lakes (primarily Myriophyllum elatinoides) which it uses to build its nest. The vegetation is also the habitat of the aquatic invertebrates on which the hooded grebe feeds. For example, in the week after hatching the chicks are fed aquatic beetles (Limnaea spp.). Nesting takes place in colonies of up to 130 pairs from October to March. However, its rate of reproduction is very low as the average number of young reared per adult is 0.2 annually. Despite the lack of breeding success, the resources required for adult survival are abundant and this has resulted in a low adult mortality rate.

Threats

At all stages of the grebe's life it is vulnerable to predation by the American Mink. When the Mink first arrived in 2010–2011 on the Buenos Aires plateau, it killed more than half the adults in a breeding colony of two dozen nests. In 2012 to 2013 more losses to one Mink occurred with 15 adults and 7 juveniles killed at El Cervecero and 10 adults and 5 chicks killed at the C199 colony in La Siberia plateau. As most of the grebe population is currently in the Buenos Aires plateau the grebe is under serious threat by the Mink. The American Mink also carries out surplus killing, thus meaning that a single Mink may result in the loss of whole grebe colonies.

Other threats to the grebe population are; excessive grazing by sheep (this leads to erosion at land shores and limits the growth of vegetation), attacks by Flying steamer ducks (Tachyeres patachonicus) and predation by Kelp Gulls. Volcanic eruptions in the area may have a negative short-term effect on population size due to heavy ash fall. However, ash also results in a long-term increase in the productivity of the wetlands.

Habitat

The hooded grebe can be found in basaltic lakes during the breeding season. At the moment, the only recorded wintering sites are estuaries on the Atlantic coast of Argentina.

Distribution and population

Distribution
The breeding sites of this species are basaltic lakes in Santa Cruz, south-west Argentina and the wintering grounds are the río Coyle, río Gallegos and río Chico estuaries on the Atlantic coast of Santa Cruz. The species is also thought to be accidental in Magallanes, south Chile. Observations of two individuals have also been made from a lake in Laguna Blanca in October 2013.

Population size

In 1997 the total population size was estimated to be 3,000-5,000 individuals and half of these were on Meseta de Strobel. However, recent counts on wintering grounds have suggested a 40% decline occurring on the wintering grounds over a period of seven years. Additionally, surveys that were conducted in December 2006 and January 2009  revisited key known breeding sites initially surveyed in 1987 and 1998 also uncovered sharp population declines with numbers falling from 452 to 51 at Laguna del Sello, 700 to 0 at Laguna del Islote, 90 to 0 at Tolderia Grande and from 198 to 0 at Lagunas Encadenadas. Similarly, individuals were counted during the 2010-2011 breeding season and it was found that there has been a population decline of over 80% occurring over the last 26 years.

In 2013 a simultaneous count across all plateaus known to have ever held grebes and virtually every lake which has historic records of the species was made. The results of this study indicated a count of 691 adults and 144 chicks in 12 colonies. Furthermore, in the summer of 2014/2015 771 adults, 138 juveniles and 12 colonies were counted across 18 lakes and 3 new lakes holding the species were identified. On the other hand, on the Strobel plateau the number of lakes holding the species decreased.

In the 2009/2010 and 2010/2011 breeding seasons the species was the most abundant on the plateaus Buenos Aires, Strobel and Siberia - where five lakes contained almost 85% of the population. There was no population decline recorded on the Buenos Aires plateau between 1984/1985 and 2010/2011, however a very strong decline was detected on the Strobel plateau (96%). However, it is speculated that the annual fluctuating numbers at breeding sites are driven by movements rather than an increase or decrease in population size. Despite this, the overall decline in population which was detected on wintering and breeding grounds appears to be real and is rapidly occurring.

Population justification

The population size was estimated by O'Donnell and Fjeldsa (1997) to consist of 3,000-5,000 individuals. However, recent winter counts deduced that the minimum population size was 759 in 2010/2011. In new surveys, which occurred after recent and rapid declines in population size, the new estimation is 1,000-1,200 individuals. With 660-800 of those individuals having reached full maturity. In 2013, a survey reported at total of 771 adults and 138 chicks.

Trend justification

Studies on the wintering grounds concluded that, since the 1990s, the population may have declined by as much as 40%. If we assume an exponential rate of decline then we can predict that there is a rapid population decline of above 80% over 21 years (three generations). This trend is supported by surveys on the breeding grounds, as when the breeding grounds were counted in the winter of 2010 and 2011 no juvenile Hooded Grebes were found.

Appearance

The main features of the hooded grebe's appearance which can be used for identification.

Mainly white, but has a dark grey back up to its hind neck. 
A black head with a contrasting white forehead and a red, peaked forecrown.
Extensively white flanks.

Status and conservation
The hooded grebe is threatened by climate change and the introduction of trout and salmon to the Strobel plateau. Surveys made in 2006, 2009 and 2010–2011, found some lakes completely dry and with water levels  lower than in previous years. In addition, winter snowfall has reduced without a corresponding increase in precipitation at other times of the year.

Predation by kelp gulls (Larus dominicanus) at some lakes, predation by the recently introduced American mink, the excessive grazing by sheep and low breeding potential have been cited as threats.

Conservation actions underway
Laguna Los Escarchados (the site where the species was discovered in 1974) was declared a reserve in 1979, but hold only a marginal population. In 1992, six individuals were recorded within Perito Moreno National Park. The key breeding lakes in the core of its range, lack any kind of legal protection, but the population of the hooded grebe on Meseta de Strobel have some protection due to its inaccessibility. A 30-minute documentary called 'Tango in the Wind' outlines conservation actions to save the hooded grebe.

Conservation actions proposed

The recommendations below all come from the final report of the Hooded Grebe Project
Continue to survey the breeding colonies and winter censuses of estuaries and unfrozen lakes.
Expand the 'Colony Guardian' approach to all active colonies.
Devise and carry out a species recovery plan. 
Remove the American Mink from the high plateau habitats and control the size of Kelp Gull populations on breeding sites. 
Increase the area ban on the introduction of salmonids to grebe breeding locations and help raise awareness of the impacts of introducing salmonids.
Study the grebe's ecology in more detail in order to understand its population movements. 
There is planned research into the grebe's migration which is supported by the Zoological Society of London's EDGE of Existence programme and Cornell University. 
Gather empirical data on population size and trends in population size.
Continue to study the main threats to the grebe population and the reasons behind recent declines.
The use of Patagonia National Park as a protected area where species management activities occur. 
The establishment of the species as a National Natural Monument.

References

 Hooded Grebe Factsheet at Birdlife.org
 Hooded Grebe at Edgeofexistence.org

External links
Images and videos at the IBC. The Internet Bird Collection.

hooded grebe
Birds of Patagonia
Endemic birds of Argentina
Critically endangered animals
Critically endangered biota of South America
hooded grebe